Radio SRF 3 is the third radio station from Schweizer Radio und Fernsehen (SRF). The station was launched on 1 November 1983 at 00:01 hours (as DRS 3) in response to the licensing of private radio stations in Switzerland that was directed primarily for music to a younger audience, and was later repositioned to a "generalist young-adults" station in 1999 following the launch of DRS Virus that same year. The Station Broadcasts In Swiss-German, Except In News Programs, Which Are transmitted In Standard German.

Former logos

External links

1983 establishments in Switzerland
Radio stations established in 1983
German-language radio stations in Switzerland